Margaret Ellen McCuaig-Boyd  (born September 14, 1952) is a Canadian politician who was elected in the Alberta General Election, 2015 to the Legislative Assembly of Alberta representing the electoral district of Dunvegan-Central Peace-Notley. She was Minister of Energy in the Alberta Cabinet.

She lost her seat to UCP candidate Todd Loewen in the 2019 Alberta General Election, which also saw the defeat of the Notley NDP government.

Life before Politics
Born in Calgary, McCuaig-Boyd holds a master's degree in Education Administration and Leadership, and served as Vice-President of the Fairview Campus of Grande Prairie Regional College from 2009 to 2013.

Prior to running in the 2015 election, McCuaig-Boyd was semi-retired and ran a consulting company.

Ms. McCuaig-Boyd holds a bachelor's degree in education from the University of Alberta and a master's degree in administration and leadership from San Diego State University.

In 2005, Ms. McCuaig-Boyd was the recipient of the Robert H. Routledge Award from the Alberta Schools Athletic Association for outstanding service to Alberta students and for the promotion and operation of an athletic program.

She is an active member of the community serving as a member and president of the Fairview Rotary Club and as a board member of the Fairview Chamber of Commerce.

Criticism
During the 2015 campaign, she advocated for a progressive tax and less reliance in the province on oil and gas money. She had no prior energy industry experience, and the main reason for her appointment to the Energy portfolio may have been her background in northern Alberta, where it is a vital industry.

Electoral history

2019 general election

2015 general election

1997 general election

References

1952 births
Alberta New Democratic Party MLAs
Living people
Members of the Executive Council of Alberta
Politicians from Calgary
Women MLAs in Alberta
21st-century Canadian politicians
21st-century Canadian women politicians
Canadian educators
Women government ministers of Canada
San Diego State University alumni
University of Alberta alumni